Drache is a German word meaning "dragon". It may refer to:

People
 Daniel Drache, contemporary scholar in Canadian and international political economy, globalization studies, communication studies
 Eric Drache, American professional poker player, cardroom manager and consultant for NBC
 Heinz Drache (1923–2002), German film actor
 Hiram Drache, American historian

Ships
 SMS Drache, several ships
 Yugoslav minelayer Zmaj, renamed Drache after being captured by Germans in 1941

See also 
 Fa 223 Drache ("Dragon"), a helicopter developed by Germany during World War II
 Draché, a commune in the Indre-et-Loire department in central France
 Drachen Fire, an Arrow Dynamics roller coaster that operated from 1992 to 1998, at Busch Gardens Williamsburg
 Der Kampf mit dem Drachen ("The Battle with the Dragon"), a 300-verse ballad by Friedrich Schiller

German-language surnames